The 2018 German Open (also known as the 2018 German Tennis Championships) was a men's tennis tournament played on outdoor red clay courts. It was the 112th edition of the German Open Tennis Championships and part of the ATP World Tour 500 series of the 2018 ATP World Tour. It took place at the Am Rothenbaum in Hamburg, Germany, from July 23 through 29, 2018.

Points and prize money

Points distribution

Prize money

Singles main draw entrants

Seeds

 1 Rankings are as of 16 July 2018.

Other entrants
The following players received wildcards into the main draw:
  Florian Mayer  
  Rudolf Molleker  
  Casper Ruud 

The following player received entry as a special exempt:
  Henri Laaksonen

The following players received entry from the qualifying draw:
  Nikoloz Basilashvili
  Jozef Kovalík
  Daniel Masur
  Corentin Moutet

The following player received entry as a lucky loser:
  Thiago Monteiro

Withdrawals 
Before the tournament
  Filip Krajinović → replaced by  Aljaž Bedene
  Lucas Pouille → replaced by  Nicolás Jarry
  Andreas Seppi → replaced by  Thiago Monteiro
  Stefanos Tsitsipas → replaced by  Jan-Lennard Struff

During the tournament
  Richard Gasquet

Retirements 
  Aljaž Bedene

Doubles main draw entrants

Seeds

1 Rankings are as of 16 July 2018.

Other entrants 
The following pairs received wildcards into the doubles main draw:
  Jürgen Melzer /  Dominic Thiem
  Philipp Petzschner /  Tim Pütz 

The following pair received entry from the qualifying draw:
  Martin Kližan /  Jozef Kovalík

Champions

Singles 

  Nikoloz Basilashvili def.  Leonardo Mayer, 6–4, 0–6, 7–5

Doubles 

  Julio Peralta /  Horacio Zeballos def.  Oliver Marach /  Mate Pavić, 6–1, 4–6, [10–6]

References

External links 
 

2010s in Hamburg
2018 in German tennis
2018
2018 ATP World Tour
 
July 2018 sports events in Germany